The 2022 Dally M Awards were presented on 28 September 2022. They are the official annual awards of the National Rugby League and are named after Dally Messenger.

Dally M Medal 

Dally M Player of the Year (Men):  Nicho Hynes

Dally M Player of the Year (Women):  Raecene McGregor

Dally M Awards 
The Dally M Awards are, as usual, conducted at the close of the regular season and hence do not take games played in the finals series into account.

Team of the Year

Woman's Team of the Year

See also
Dally M Awards
Dally M Medal
2022 NRL season

Notes

References 

Dally M Awards
Dally M Awards
Dally M